JEI Learning Center is an individualized, supplemental education franchise from JEI Corporation. A low student-to-teacher ratio allows only 5 students per instructor, ensuring that each student receives enough personal attention. Some learning centres offer 1 to 1 classes with the teacher coming to your home. The curriculum offered by JEI Self-Learning Method is a self-paced, individualized program designed to help pre-kindergarten to 9th grade students learn math and language concepts step-by-step, aligned with Common Core State Standards. JEI Learning Center provides a diagnostic test and track record system that pinpoints fundamental strengths and weaknesses in subject comprehension. Using these results, specialized workbooks are assigned that focus on a scientific study method to address each student's needs.

History
Established in 1977 by educator and entrepreneur, Sung Hoon Park, JEI Learning Center was founded in Seoul, Korea. Sung Hoon Park and a team of education researchers developed the JEI Self Learning Method, an individually paced, step-by-step learning program, for students who need supplementary education in mathematics and language concepts.
After decades of successful operation in South Korea, in 1992, Sung Hoon Park brought the JEI Method to the United States, followed by Canada, UAE, Hong Kong, China, Australia, and New Zealand, consisting of over 500 locations worldwide.

Programs

JEI Math
JEI Math offers a comprehensive program for pre-K through 9th grade. There are approximately 36 weekly workbooks per grade level, and each weekly workbook consists of 16 pages. At the end of each weekly workbook is an interim test on the material learnt throughout the week. JEI Math curriculum is aligned with Common Core State Standards.

JEI English
JEI English is designed to build a strong foundation in grammar, vocabulary, and reading skills. Curriculum is aligned to the National Council of Teachers of English (NCTE) Standards.

JEI Reading & Writing
JEI Reading & Writing is a literature-based program focused on comprehension as well as writing. Accompanied with full novel reading list, the curriculum is targeted for advanced level students or for those needing an extra challenge.

JEI Problem Solving Math
JEI Problem Solving Math develops critical and analytical skills, with math problems presented in styles similar to those found in Math Olympiad. Curriculum focuses on word problems and critical thinking-related questions.

Brain Safari
Brain Safari strengthens logical and analytical skills, enhances creativity and memory proficiency, and increase overall intelligence by focusing on the 9 different learning domains of critical thinking.

Diagnostic System
First, the student takes JEI's diagnostic test appropriate to student's level which is determined after teacher interacts with the student, which then JEI's diagnostic system comprehensively analyses each student's test results and assigns them an individualized learning program. JEI Learning Center provides the Individual Progress Prescription Report (IPPR), a detailed computer analysis of a student's learning needs and performance during the curriculum.

Awards
In 2014, Entrepreneur (magazine) and Business Insider ranked JEI Learning Center #191 in the Franchise 500® and #119 in America's Top Global. In 2015, JEI Learning Center ranked #198 in the Franchise 500® and #45 in America's Top Global.

See also
Storefront school

References

Education companies of South Korea